Ratasepp is a surname. Notable people with the surname include:

Anton Ratasepp, Estonian politician
Katariina Ratasepp (born 1986), Estonian actress
Ursula Ratasepp (born 1982), Estonian actress

Estonian-language surnames